Tobler may refer to:

 Tobler (name), a surname originating in Germany (and list of people with the name)
 Tom Brownlees or Tobler, an Australian rules football player
 Tobler hyperelliptical projection, a family of map projections
 Chocolat Tobler, a chocolate more commonly known as Toblerone
 Villa Tobler, a listed building in Zürich, Switzerland

See also
 Tobler's crow (Euploea tobleri), a species of nymphalid butterfly
 Tobler's first law of geography, according to Waldo Tobler